Events from the year 1698 in England.

Incumbents
 Monarch – William III
 Parliament – 3rd of King William III (until 7 July), 4th of King William III (starting 24 August)

Events 
 4 January – the Palace of Whitehall is destroyed by fire.
 11 January–21 April – Czar Peter I of Russia visits England as part of his Grand Embassy, making a particular study of shipbuilding.
 March – Jeremy Collier's pamphlet A Short View of the Immorality and Profaneness of the English Stage is published.
 24 June – abolition of the Royal African Company's monopoly is confirmed under terms of the Trade with Africa Act 1697, opening the slave trade to any merchant.
 25 July – engineer Thomas Savery obtains a patent for a steam pump.
 July–August – general election results in victory for the New Country Tories.
 11 October – Treaty of the Hague signed between France, England and Holland.
 14 November – first Eddystone Lighthouse illuminated.

Undated
 Piracy Act ("An Act for the more effectuall Suppressions of Piracy") passed.
 Popery Act enforces penalties against Roman Catholic priests.
 Reverend Thomas Bray founds the Society for Promoting Christian Knowledge.
 Thermal springs discovered at Matlock Bath in Derbyshire.
 The widow Bourne sets up the business which becomes Berry Brothers and Rudd in London. They will still be operating as wine merchants in the 21st century.
 Shepherd Neame Brewery established under this name in Faversham.

Births
 10 January? – Richard Savage, poet (died 1743)
 8 May – Henry Baker, naturalist (died 1774)
 26 September – William Cavendish, 3rd Duke of Devonshire (died 1755)
 24 December – William Warburton, critic and Bishop of Gloucester (died 1779)

Deaths
 24 January – William Holder, music theorist (born 1616)
 7 February – Richard Adams, theologian (born c. 1626)
 29 April – Charles Cornwallis, 3rd Baron Cornwallis, First Lord of the Admiralty (born 1655)
 25 August – Fleetwood Sheppard, courtier and literary wit (born 1634)
 3 September – Sir Robert Howard, playwright, poet and politician (born 1626)
 13 September (bur.) – John Huddleston, Benedictine priest (born 1608)
 1 October – Richard Frankland, dissenter (born 1630)
 Unknown date – Nicholas Barbon, economist (born c. 1640)

References

 
Years of the 17th century in England